Operation Desert Lion began on 27 March 2003. Soldiers from the U.S. 505th Parachute Infantry Regiment and 82nd Airborne Division launched the operation in the Kohe Safi Mountains and surrounding areas in the Kandahar province of Afghanistan, near Bagram Air Base. Their mission was to hunt for supplies and members of the Taliban and Al-Qaida. The action began with soldiers debouching from Chinook and Black Hawk helicopters. The soldiers found two caches of weapons that included 107mm rockets, mortar rounds, recoilless rocket rounds, and cases of machine-gun ammunition just five kilometers from the air base. Disposal experts blew up the caches in place.

Combined Joint Task Force 180 spokeswoman Capt. Alayne Cramer said coalition troops had searched the area before. "Intelligence sources and tips from local Afghans suggested we revisit the area," Cramer said.

On 29 March 2003 forces engaged in Operation Desert Lion received air support from two Norwegian F-16 fighter bombers flying on a routine patrol over the area. Operation Desert Lion was concluded on 30 March 2003.

References

2003 in Afghanistan
War in Afghanistan (2001–2021)
March 2003 events in Asia
Military operations of the War in Afghanistan (2001–2021) involving the United States